Shawheen Peiravani (born 8 August 1994) is an Iranian professional footballer who plays as a midfielder in the Persian Gulf Pro League. He has played for notable clubs Fajr Sepasi Shiraz F.C.  Rah Ahan Tehran F.C. and Qashqai F.C. Peiravani was born in Los Angeles, California but grew up in Portland, Oregon.

Career 
Peiravani started his youth club career in Portland, Oregon. Playing for club FC Portland.
Peiravani played collegiate football at the University of Tulsa, winning the Conference USA title in 2013. He started his professional career in Missouri, signing a 1-year deal with the Springfield Demize in the USL. After his debut season in the states, Peiravani joined Fajr Sepasi Shiraz F.C. in the Persian Gulf Pro League at the age of 19. He would go on to  play for teams such as Rah Ahan Tehran F.C. and Qashqai F.C.

During his time at Qashqai F.C. He was coached by former Sporting CP player and Portuguese National Marco Almeida

Personal life 
Peiravani was sidelined for 1 year in 2017 due to an abdominal tear. 

Peiravani is the nephew of former Professional Footballer Afshin Peiravani

References  
 The University of Tulsa 2012 Men's Soccer Roster.

1994 births
Iranian footballers
Living people
Association football midfielders
Rah Ahan players